Lucky Man is a 1995 Indian Tamil-language fantasy comedy film directed by Pratap Pothen. The film stars Karthik, Goundamani, Senthil, and Sanghavi, while Manjula Vijayakumar, Radha Ravi, Vinu Chakravarthy, and Thyagu play supporting roles. It is a remake of the 1994 Telugu film Yamaleela. The film released on 14 April 1995.

Plot 

The film starts in heaven where Yama's assistant Chitragupta loses the Brahma Suvadi book written by Shiva, Vishnu, and Brahma to administrate human birth, death, post-death punishment, and rebirth. The Brahma Suvadi falls into a city in Tamil Nadu, and Gopi, a young man, gets hold of the book and becomes rich using the book. At the same time, Brahma come to know that the book is lost and orders Yama and Chitragupta to locate the book within one month. Chitragupta fears that if the book is seen by humans, chaos will happen. However, Yama assures him that only the details of the person who is viewing the same will be shown by the book. Meanwhile, Yama and Chitragupta come to Tamil Nadu to search for the book. One day, Gopi learns about his mother's death date through that book. Now, Gopi wants to save his mother and win his lover. Gopi's opponent Sivaraman, a ruthless don, wants to know Gopi's secret of success, and he plans to steal the book from Gopi by abducting his mother and lover. In the climax, Yama helps Gopi secure the book from Sivaraman and kill him. Yama also spares Gopi's mother's life for his help.

Cast 
Karthik as Gopi
Goundamani as Yama
Senthil as Chitragupta
Sanghavi as Gopi's lover
Manjula Vijayakumar as Gopi's mother
Radha Ravi as "Cheating" Sivaraman
Vinu Chakravarthy as Inspector Ranjith Kumar
Thyagu as Gopi's friend
Jayamani as Police Constable
Silk Smitha as Jill Jill Rosamani
Besant Ravi
Vijayakumar in a guest appearance

Soundtrack 
The music composed by Adithyan and lyrics written by Piraisoodan.

Release and reception 
Lucky Man was released on 14 April 1995. K. Vijiyan of New Straits Times wrote, "Lucky Man stands out as a story with a difference. It has enough laughs to make a pleasant 2 1/2 hours". T. K. Balaji of Indolink wrote, "this Pratap Pothen directed comedy manages to hold your interest for a while, before turning into a predictable chaotic mess from which there is no escape". RPR of Kalki wrote that, in contrast to the film's title, those going to watch the film were "unlucky men". The film failed commercially.

References

External links 
 

1990s fantasy comedy films
1990s Tamil-language films
1995 films
Films directed by Pratap Pothen
Indian fantasy comedy films
Tamil remakes of Telugu films
Yama in popular culture